David McAdams Sibley Sr. (born 1947) is an oral and maxillofacial surgeon, attorney and lobbyist in Austin and Waco, Texas, who served from 1991 to 2002 as a Republican member of the Texas State Senate. Previously, he was from 1987 to 1988 the mayor of Waco, then an unelected and still a nonpartisan position, as are all elected municipal offices in Texas.

References

1948 births
Living people
Republican Party Texas state senators
Politicians from Austin, Texas
Baylor University alumni
Baylor Bears men's basketball players
Mayors of Waco, Texas
Texas city council members
American lobbyists
Baptists from Texas
American dentists
Texas lawyers
American men's basketball players